Deadline is a 2001 Swedish thriller.  It was released in the US as The Bomber which is a direct translation of its original Swedish title Sprängaren which is the same as the novel by Liza Marklund from which it was adapted.  It stars Helena Bergström, Örjan Ramberg, Ewa Fröling and Pernilla August amongst others. The film was directed by Colin Nutley, who is also married to the lead actress Helena Bergström.

Plot
Annika Bengtzon, an up-and-coming young reporter for Kvällspressens newspaper, is called to the scene of a possible terrorist attack on the new Olympic Arena, Victoria Stadium in Stockholm, where the northern part of the arena has been blown to pieces.  The blast kills Christina Furhage, the Swedish Olympic ambassador, and Bengtzon soon finds out that the bombing may have been a personal attack against Furhage and not a terrorist attack.  Soon more Olympic Arenas around Stockholm are attacked and there are more victims, just months away from the Summer Olympics. A bomber with a personal agenda is on the loose.

About
The script of the film is based on the book The Bomber by Swedish author Liza Marklund. The script for the film was written by Anna Fredriksson, Johanna Hald and Colin Nutley.

Cast
Helena Bergström - Annika Bengtzon
Niklas Hjulström - Thomas Samuelsson
Örjan Ramberg - Anders Schyman
Reine Brynolfsson - Spiken
Brasse Brännström - Nils Langeby
Ewa Fröling - Berit
Pernilla August - Beata Ekesjö
Tomas Pontén - Evert Danielsson
Maria Lundqvist - Eva-Britt Qvist
Tilde Fröling

References

External links

2001 films
2001 thriller films
Swedish thriller films
Films directed by Colin Nutley
Films based on Swedish novels
2000s Swedish films